Trảng Bom is a rural district of Đồng Nai province in the Southeast region of Vietnam. Located on National Highway 1. 

The village of Trảng Bom was attacked by Viet Cong forces during the 1968 Tet Offensive and in February the Fire support base which contained New Zealand and American artillery and Australian cavalry, engineer, and infantry elements was attacked three times by Viet Cong forces during Operation Coburg but were successfully repelled each time. Trảng Bom was also the site of fierce fighting in April 1975, prior to the fall of Saigon and the end of the Republic of Vietnam.

As of 2003 the district had a population of 192,627. The district covers an area of 326 km². The district capital lies at Trảng Bom.

Administrative divisions
In the district there are 16 municipalities:
 An Viễn
 Bàu Hàm 1
 Bắc Sơn
 Bình Minh, Trảng Bom
 Cây Gáo
 Đông Hòa
 Đồi 61
 Giang Điền
 Hố Nai 3
 Hưng Thịnh
 Quảng Tiến
 Sông Thao
 Sông Trầu
 Tây Hòa
 Thanh Bình
 Trung Hòa

References

Districts of Đồng Nai province